The University of Northern California, Lorenzo Patiño School of Law (UNC) was a private law school located in Sacramento, California. UNC offered a part-time, four-year law program as well as a paralegal program. Law school registration was terminated during the June 28–29, 2013 meeting of the State Bar. As of June 30, 2013, UNC was no longer listed as a law school by the State Bar of California Committee of Bar Examiners and the University of Northern California's website removed the listing of the Juris Doctor as one of its academic programs.

History
The law school was founded in 1983 by Rose and Leonard Padilla, Lorenzo Patino, Douglas Nareau, Greg Padilla, Danny Brace and Herman Smith as the University of Northern California. After the untimely death of Lorenzo Pacino, it was renamed in his honor. The Superior Court for the County of Sacramento Hall of Justice is also named in honor of Judge Patiño 

The school held its first classes in the spring of 1983. The first instructors were Douglas Nareau, John Ewing, Betty Rocker, Heman Smith and Linda Dankman. Nareau and Ewing were featured in The Sacramento Bee as Valedictorians of their respective law schools. Betty Rocker was one of Sacramento's premier criminal defense attorneys and Smith had gained praise for successful litigation that challenged redlining as a loan practice. Lorenzo Patino was one of the first Latino judges in the state.

One hundred and eighty seven students enrolled the first year. Doug Nareau sold his shares in the wchool in 1984 to move to Del Norte County where he became the District Attorney and was honored as The We-Tip 1987 National District Attorney of the year.

Authorization to operate
The law school did not have professional accreditation from either the American Bar Association Office of the Consultant on Legal Education or the State Bar of California Committee of Bar Examiners.

As an unaccredited educational institution, the UNC had to be authorized to operate by the California Bureau for Private Postsecondary Education. It was approved to confer the Juris Doctor degree and a certificate in paralegal studies. It was registered as an unaccredited law school with the State Bar of California Committee of Bar Examiners.

Because it was not accredited, UNC law students had to take and pass the First-year Law Students' Examination, informally called the "Baby Bar", at the end of their first year to receive credit for their legal study and as one of the qualifications to sit the California Bar Examination after taking the degree.

At its June 2013 meeting, the State Bar of California terminated the school's registration as an unaccredited, fixed-facility and degree granting authority, effective as of June 30, 2013.

Bar pass rates
From 1997 through February 2011, 134 Lorenzo Patiño graduates took the California Bar Examination as first-time takers; of that number, 12 passed the examination for a 9% pass rate.

See also
 List of colleges and universities in California

References and notes

External links
 

Defunct private universities and colleges in California
Educational institutions established in 1983
1983 establishments in California
Defunct law schools